Crossville is the name of the following towns in the United States:
Crossville, Alabama
Crossville, Illinois
Crossville, Tennessee